Daniel O'Brien (10 July 1939 – 10 July 2001) was an Irish boxer. He competed in the men's lightweight event at the 1960 Summer Olympics.

References

External links
 

1939 births
2001 deaths
British male boxers
Irish male boxers
Olympic boxers of Ireland
Boxers at the 1960 Summer Olympics
Boxers from Greater London
Lightweight boxers